The Centenary Medal was an award created by the Australian Government in 2001 regarding the Centenary of Federation of Australia.

It may also refer to:
 Centenary Medal (RPS), a medal awarded by the Royal Photographic Society, in recognition of a sustained, significant contribution to the art of photography
 Centenary Medal (Prussia), was a medal awarded by Prussia, formally known as the Kaiser Wilhelm Memorial Medal, on the occasion of the 100th Birthday of Emperor Wilhelm I.
 Centenary Medal (Ireland), formally known as the 1916 Centenary Commemorative Medal, was a military award by the Irish Government, on occasion of the 100th anniversary of the Easter Rising
 Centenary of National Independence Commemorative Medal, was a Belgian commemorative medal to commemorate the 100th anniversary of Belgian independence
 David Livingstone Centenary Medal, a medal awarded by the American Geographical Society for scientific achievements in the field of geography of the Southern Hemisphere